Dee Hills House is in Dee Hills Park, Chester, Cheshire, England.

History
The house was built as a country house in 1814. An extension was built in the 1930s. It was recorded in the National Heritage List for England as a designated Grade II listed building on 10 January 1972. It was designed by Thomas Harrison for Robert Baxter, and has since been altered and used as offices.

Architecture
The building is made up of two storeys with a three-bay garden projection with Ionic columns facing the River Dee. The front entrance includes a Roman-styled Doric porch. The house's south front features a veranda with four Doric columns.

See also

Grade II listed buildings in Chester (east)
List of works by Thomas Harrison

References
Citations

Sources

 

Houses in Chester
Grade II listed buildings in Chester
Grade II listed houses
Thomas Harrison buildings
Houses completed in 1814
Neoclassical architecture in Cheshire